Tasek Gelugor or Tasek Glugor may refer to:
Tasek Gelugor
Tasek Gelugor (federal constituency), represented in the Dewan Rakyat
Tasek Gelugor (state constituency), formerly represented in the Penang State Legislative Assembly (1959–86)